John Earl Jelks (also credited as John Jelks; born July 16, 1959) is an American actor. Working extensively in theatre, Jelks is also known for screen roles, including in films such as Compensation (1999), Miracle at St. Anna (2008), Enter the Dangerous Mind (2013), Night Comes On (2018), and television series such as True Detective (2019), The I-Land (2019), and On Becoming a God in Central Florida (2019).

In 2007, he was nominated for a Tony Award for Best Featured Actor in a Play for his role as Sterling Johnson in August Wilson's Radio Golf. In 2014, Jelks won a double Obie Award for Fetch Clay, Make Man and Sunset Baby. For First Breeze of Summer, Jelks also won the AUDELCO Award for Best Featured Actor in a Play, in addition to the production winning.

Early life
Jelks' family was originally from Mississippi. He spent much of his childhood in California and Illinois, including in Chicago.

Career
Jelks began acting at 18 while attending the City College of San Francisco, a public community college. He began his career in 1979 when he acted in his first play, Pinocchio Jones, which also starred Cindy Herron and was performed at Balboa High School. He went on to act in several plays, not acquiring an agent until he had been performing on stage for 7 years.

Stage acting
For a decade, from 1989 to 1999, Jelks performed in the independent play The Diary of Black Men. In 2002, Jelks performed The Piano Lesson at the Lorraine Hansberry Theatre. Later that year, Jelks performed Joe Turner's Come and Gone (directed by Marion McClinton) at the Kansas City Repertory Theatre and again at the Penumbra Theatre, where he later became a company member.

In 2004, Jelks made his Broadway debut in the August Wilson play Gem of the Ocean, which starred Phylicia Rashad. Gem of the Ocean was the first installment in Wilson's decade-by-decade ten-play chronicle, The Pittsburgh Cycle, dramatizing the African-American experience in the 20th century. Directed by Kenny Leon, the production took place at the Walter Kerr Theatre and has received five Tony Award nominations.

Jelks collaborated again with August Wilson in the 2007 premiere of the play Radio Golf at the Cort Theatre on Broadway. The final installment of the Pittsburgh Cycle, the production received 3 Tony Award nominations, including Best Play and Best Featured Actor in a Play for both Jelks and Anthony Chisholm.

In 2010, Jelks performed in the world premiere of the stage version of The Shawshank Redemption at the Gaiety Theatre in Dublin, Ireland. The play was based on the Stephen King novel that had been successfully adapted for the screen by Frank Darabont. Jelks played the part of Red in the production directed by Peter Sheridan and adapted for the stage by Owen O'Neil and Dave Johns.

Jelks has worked extensively in other Broadway and regional productions including Magnolia (2009), Fetch Clay, Make Man (2010), The Break of Noon (2010), Two Trains Running (2013), Sunset Baby (2013), Holler If Ya Hear Me (2014), ToasT (2015), The Piano Lesson (2016), and Head of Passes (2016).

In 2014, Jelks conducted acting workshops and performed in the play The Meeting at the Terra Sancta Theater in Amman, Jordan.

From 2016 to 2018 Jelks performed in 3 productions of Lynn Nottage's Pulitzer Prize-winning play Sweat, playing the part of Brucie, a middle-aged man unemployed for 2 years after losing his factory job. The play was performed in New York at the Public Theater Martinson Hall in 2016, before moving to Studio 54 in 2017. Jelks returned in 2018 for a run at the Mark Taper Forum in Los Angeles.

Screen acting
Jelks first starring screen role came in the 1999 film Compensation, which premiered at Sundance. The film depicts two Chicago love stories, one set in the 1900s and one in the 1990s, with both couples played by the same actors. Jelks played the dual roles of Arthur Jones and Nico Jones.

He has also appeared in Spike Lee's 2008 World War II historical film Miracle at St. Anna, and in Jordana Spiro's 2018 drama Night Comes On, which premiered at Sundance. In 2019, he acted in series 3 of HBO's anthology crime drama series True Detective, Netflix's science-fiction thriller miniseries The I-Land, as well as a recurring role in the Showtime comedy On Becoming a God in Central Florida.

Personal life
Jelks is a widower, having lost his wife of 12 years, Naomi, in a traffic accident in 2002. The couple had 3 children, sons Jamal, Jabari, and daughter Jamila. The loss of his wife had led Jelks to consider leaving acting, but he eventually decided to remain in the career for his children. He dedicated his performance in the play Gem of the Ocean to his late wife.

Filmography

Film

Television

Short film

Stage

Video games

Awards and nominations

References

External links
John Earl Jelks
John Earl Jelks on IMDb

Living people
1959 births
African-American actors
21st-century African-American people
20th-century African-American people